This is a list of radio station markets sorted in alphabetical order.

Additional markets 
 Springfield, IL
 Sioux Falls, SD
 Blacksburg-Christiansburg-Radford-Pulaski, VA
 St. George-Cedar City, UT
 Owensboro, KY
 Meadville-Franklin, PA
 Great Falls, MT
 Johnstown, PA
 The Florida Keys, FL

See also
 List of television stations in North America by media market

References

Current List of U.S. Radio Markets (ranked by size)
2001 List of U.S. Radio Markets (ranked by size)
Arbitron Radio Workshop 101
Glossary of radio market terms
List of qualitative diary markets from Arbitron
US Metro map from Arbitron

Mass media in the United States by city
Radio in the United States